Beauvericin is a depsipeptide with antibiotic and insecticidal effects belonging to the enniatin family. It was isolated from the fungus Beauveria bassiana, but is also produced by several other fungi, including several Fusarium species; it may therefore occur in grain (such as corn, wheat and barley) contaminated with these fungi. Beauvericin is active against Gram-positive bacteria and mycobacteria, and is also capable of inducing programmed cell death in mammals.

Chemically, beauvericin is a cyclic hexadepsipeptide with alternating N-methyl-phenylalanyl and D-hydroxy-iso-valeryl residues. Its ion-complexing capability allows beauvericin to transport alkaline earth metal and alkali metal ions across cell membranes.

Beauvericin has in vitro fungicidal effects on Candida parapsilosis when used in combination with the antifungal drug ketoconazole at dosages of 0.1 μg/ml.  Increased survivability rates and low cytotoxicity were also observed in mouse models.

References 

Antibiotics
Mycotoxins
Ionophores
Depsipeptides